Amaranth, FD&C Red No. 2, E123, C.I. Food Red 9, Acid Red 27, Azorubin S, or C.I. 16185 is a modified red azo dye used as a food dye and to color cosmetics. The name was taken from amaranth grain, a plant distinguished by its red color and edible protein-rich seeds.

Amaranth is an anionic dye. It can be applied to natural and synthetic fibers, leather, paper, and phenol-formaldehyde resins. As a food additive it has E number E123. Amaranth usually comes as a trisodium salt. It has the appearance of reddish-brown, dark red to purple water-soluble powder that decomposes at 120 °C without melting. Its water solution has absorption maximum at about 520 nm. Like all azo dyes, Amaranth was, during the middle of the 20th century, made from coal tar; modern synthetics are more likely to be made from petroleum byproducts.

Since 1976 Amaranth dye has been banned in the United States by the Food and Drug Administration (FDA) as a suspected carcinogen. Its use is still legal in some countries, notably in the United Kingdom where it is most commonly used to give glacé cherries their distinctive color.

History and health effects
After an incident in the 1950s involving Orange 1, the FDA retested food colors. Later, in 1960, the FDA was given jurisdiction over color additives, limiting the amounts that could be added to foods and requiring producers of food color to ensure safety and proper labeling of colors. Permission to use food additives was given on a provisional basis, which could be withdrawn should safety issues arise. The FDA gave "generally recognized as safe" (GRAS) provisional status to substances already in use, and extended Red No. 2's provisional status 14 times.

In 1971, a Soviet study linked the dye to cancer. Consumer activists in the United States, perturbed by what they perceived as collusion between the FDA and food conglomerates, put pressure on the FDA to ban it. FDA Commissioner Alexander M. Schmidt defended the agency's stance, as he had earlier defended the FDA against collusion accusations in his 1975 book, stating that the FDA found "no evidence of a public health hazard". However testing by the FDA found a statistically significant increase in the incidence of malignant tumors in female rats given a high dosage of the dye, and concluded that since there could also no longer be a presumption of safety, that use of the dye should be discontinued. The FDA banned FD&C Red No. 2 in 1976. FD&C Red No. 40 (Allura Red AC) replaced the banned Red No. 2.

See also
Amaranth (color)
Federal Food, Drug, and Cosmetic Act

Red dyes 
 Allura Red AC (FD&C Red 40)
Carmoisine

References

Azo dyes
Food colorings
Organic sodium salts
Naphthalenesulfonates
Suspected carcinogens
Suspected fetotoxicants
Acid dyes